My Kind of Christmas is the thirtieth studio album and third Christmas album by American country music singer Reba McEntire. It was released on September 2, 2016, by Nash Icon/Rockin' R Records exclusively through Cracker Barrel Old Country Store. McEntire produced the album with her musical director Doug Sisemore. The album was reissued to all retailers, as well as all digital platforms on October 13, 2017, with additional tracks and new cover art. The album was further reissued in October 2018 with one additional bonus track, the CD version of which was exclusive to Walmart stores in North America.

Release and promotion
The album was announced on July 22, 2016. Following the album's exclusive release at Cracker Barrel stores on September 2, "Hard Candy Christmas" and "I'll Be Home for Christmas" were both issued as singles on November 17.

The album was reissued to all retailers, as well as digital platforms in 2017, featuring new artwork and four additional tracks and replaced her solo version of "Silent Night" with her 2013 version featuring Kelly Clarkson and Trisha Yearwood which was previously included as the ending track on Clarkson's Wrapped in Red album in 2013. To promote the album's wide retail release, McEntire hosted the annual CMA Country Christmas special on November 27.

The album was reissued a second time in 2018. This edition of the album features the same artwork and track listing as the 2017 reissue, with the addition of one new track. It was made available to all digital platforms and the CD version was sold exclusively through Walmart stores. On December 10, McEntire hosted the CMA Country Christmas special for the second year in a row.

Commercial performance
The album debuted at No. 27 on the Billboard Top Country Albums chart dated September 17, 2016, with 2,100 copies sold. The album peaked at No. 1 on the Billboard Top Holiday Albums chart for the week ending October 22. The album saw further chart success when it was reissued in 2017. It reached its peak position of No. 7 on the Billboard Top Country Albums chart dated December 16, 2017. The album also peaked at No. 39 on the Billboard 200 chart dated December 30. In Canada, the album peaked at No. 62 on the Canadian Albums chart dated December 30, 2017. The album has sold 58,900 copies in the United States as of November 2017.

Track listing

Personnel
Adapted from the original 2016 release liner notes.
Chris Ashburn – recording assistant
Brett Freedman – hair, makeup
Terry Gordon – wardrobe
Taylor Colson Horton – art direction
Laurel Kittleson – production coordinator
Nick Lane –  mixing assistant
Catherine Marx – piano, arrangements (tracks 4, 6, 8, 10)
Reba McEntire – girl singer, producer, arrangements (tracks 4, 6, 8, 10), liner notes
Justin McIntosh – art direction, graphic design
Cameron Powell – photographer, art direction
Doug Sisemore – producer, production coordinator
Janice Soled – production coordinator
Brianna Steinitz – production coordinator
Todd Tidwell – recording, mixing

Charts

Weekly charts

Year-end charts

Release history

References

2016 Christmas albums
Reba McEntire albums
Big Machine Records albums
Albums produced by Greg Kurstin
Country Christmas albums